Events from the year 1701 in Denmark.

Incumbents
 Monarch – Frederick IV
 Grand Chancellor – Conrad von Reventlow

Events
 26 April  Commodore C. T. Sehested adjourns as the first chief of the new Royal Danish Naval Academy. The institution is created with inspiration from similar institutions in the Netherlands and France.

Undated
 A Danish Auxiliary Corps of 8,000 soldiers is garrisoned in Saxony, protecting the hereditary lands of August the Strong,
 Ole Rømer proposes the Rømer scale.
 25 May  Christian Gyldenløve marries Dorothea Krag in Copenhagen.

Births
 4 (or 22) June – Nicolai Eigtved, architect (died 1754)
 23 September – Bredo von Munthe af Morgenstierne, civil servant, Supreme Court justice and landowner (died 1757)

Full date missing
 Stephen Hansen, industrialist, businessman and General War Commissioner (died 1669)

Deaths

Full date missing
 December – Henrik Ehm, industrialist, coppersmith and alchemist
Adriaen Foly, painter
Oliger Jacobaeus, professor, physician and naturalist

References

 
1700s in Denmark
Denmark
Years of the 18th century in Denmark